The 1977 RAC Tricentrol British Saloon Car Championship was the 20th season of the championship. Bernard Unett won his third drivers title with a Chrysler Avenger GT.

Calendar & Winners
All races were held in the United Kingdom. Overall winners in bold.

Championship results

References

British Touring Car Championship seasons
Saloon